Alfaguara is a Spanish-language publishing house that serves markets in Latin America, Spain and the United States. It was founded by the Spanish writer and Nobel prize winner Camilo José Cela.

History and profile 
Alfaguara was established in 1964. It was part of Editoriales del Grupo Santillana. In March 2000 Santillana, which publishes over 117 million books each year, was acquired by the Spanish conglomerate PRISA. In 2014, PRISA sold Santillana's trade operations to Penguin Random House.

It awards the Alfaguara Prize, a prestigious Spanish-language literary award. The prize, launched in 1998, goes to an unpublished work of fiction in Spanish.

Alfaguara Infantil and Alfaguara Juvenil publish books for children and young people.

References 

1964 establishments in Spain
Publishing companies established in 1964
PRISA
Publishing companies of Spain
Mass media in Madrid
Book publishing companies of Spain
Penguin Random House
 
Camilo José Cela